Lieutenant General Sir Alistair Stuart Hastings Irwin,  (born 27 August 1948) is a retired British Army officer and a former Adjutant-General to the Forces.

Early life
Irwin was born on 27 August 1948 in Dundee. He was educated at Lambrook preparatory school, Wellington College and the University of St Andrews, graduating in Political Economy.

Military career
After university, Irwin was commissioned into the Black Watch as a second lieutenant (on probation) on 10 August 1970. On 16 February 1971, his commission was confirmed with seniority from 25 July 1969. He was promoted to lieutenant on 25 January 1971, to captain on 25 July 1975, and to major on 30 September 1980.

In 1981 to 1982, he was posted to the Ministry of Defence as General Staff Officer II (Weapons). He was second in command of the 1st Battalion, The Black Watch from 1983 to 1984. On 30 June 1985, he was promoted to lieutenant colonel. In that year, he returned to Ministry of Defence and joined the Directorate of Command Control and Communications Systems (Army). He was also appointed Commanding Officer of the 1st Battalion, Black Watch in 1985. From 1992 to 1994 he commanded 39 Infantry Brigade in Northern Ireland.

In 1999 he became Military Secretary. He served as General Officer Commanding Northern Ireland from December 2000 to January 2003 when he was appointed Adjutant-General to the Forces, a post he held until he retired in June 2005. During his tour as Adjutant-General he strongly defended the Future Army Structure, particularly the creation of the Royal Regiment of Scotland from the regiments of the Scottish Division.

Later life
Irwin is President of the Royal British Legion for Scotland. He is a member of the advisory board of anti-independence group Scotland in Union.

Honours and decorations
Irwin was Mentioned in Despatches on 14 April 1987 "in recognition of gallant and distinguished service in Northern Ireland". He was appointed Officer of the Order of the British Empire (OBE) in the 1987 Queen's Birthday Honours. He was promoted to Commander of the Order of the British Empire (CBE) on 22 November 1994 "in recognition of gallant and distinguished services in Northern Ireland during the period 1st October 1993 to 31st March 1994". He was appointed Knight Commander of the Order of the Bath (KCB) in the 2002 Queen's Birthday Honours.

References

|-
 

|-
 

|-
 

1948 births
Alumni of the University of St Andrews
Black Watch officers
British Army lieutenant generals
Commandants of Sandhurst
Commanders of the Order of the British Empire
Knights Commander of the Order of the Bath
Living people
British military personnel of The Troubles (Northern Ireland)
Military personnel from Dundee